János Rácz (3 August 1941 – 4 March 2023) was a Hungarian basketball player. He competed in the men's tournament at the 1964 Summer Olympics.

References

External links
 

1941 births
2023 deaths
Hungarian men's basketball players
Olympic basketball players of Hungary
Basketball players at the 1964 Summer Olympics
People from Baja, Hungary
Sportspeople from Bács-Kiskun County
20th-century Hungarian people